Paul Botha Rossouw  (born 3 November 1969) is a former South African rugby union player.

Playing career

Rossouw represented Far North at the annual Craven Week tournament in 1987. He made his debut for Western Transvaal in 1990 and in 1994 he relocated to Northern Transvaal.  Rossouw toured with the Springboks to France and England in 1992 but sustained an injury and had to return to South Africa and was replaced by FC Smit. Rossouw did not play in any test matches on tour, but played in two tour matches for the Springboks.

See also
List of South Africa national rugby union players – Springbok no. 578

References

1969 births
Living people
South African rugby union players
South Africa international rugby union players
Leopards (rugby union) players
Blue Bulls players
Rugby union players from Pretoria
Rugby union flankers